Panchami is a 1976 Indian Malayalam-language film written by Malayattoor Ramakrishnan, directed by Hariharan and produced by Hari Pothan under the banner of Supriya. The film stars Prem Nazir, Jayan, Jayabharathi and Adoor Bhasi in lead roles. The film has musical score by M. S. Viswanathan, while cinematography was handled by Melli Irani. The film was a commercial success at the box office. The film is also noted for being Jayan's breakthrough role.

Cast
 
Prem Nazir as Soman
Jayan as Forest ranger John
Jayabharathi as Panchami
Adoor Bhasi as Gangan
Sankaradi as Yohannan muthalali
Meena as Periyakka
Bahadoor as Philipose
Balan K. Nair as Kochuvareed 
KPAC Sunny as Kannan
Kottarakkara Sreedharan Nair as Moopan
Master Raghu as Chinnan
Sreelatha Namboothiri as Kathreena 
N. Govindankutty as Poochary
Nedumangad Krishnan
Nellikode Bhaskaran as Kunjunni
Paravoor Bharathan as DFO
Usharani as Rukku
Cochin Haneefa

Release
The film was released on 24 June 1976. The film was commercial success.

Soundtrack
The music was composed by M. S. Viswanathan.

References

External links
  
 

1976 films
1970s Malayalam-language films
Films scored by M. S. Viswanathan
Films directed by Hariharan